Interstate 84 (I-84) in Massachusetts is the easternmost segment of the eastern I-84 freeway originating in Dunmore, Pennsylvania, (near Scranton). Within Massachusetts, I-84 exists in the towns of Holland and Sturbridge. Known as the Wilbur Cross Highway, it has also been signed as Route 15 between 1948 and 1980 as well as Interstate 86 (I-86) between 1971 and 1984. The Massachusetts segment of I-84 is the shortest state length of the four states it travels through.

Route description

History

Origins
The highway originated as Route 15, an extension of Connecticut Route 15 (then known as the Wilbur Cross Highway). The extension started in Holland, and, within , it entered Sturbridge as Mashapaug Road. It then followed Haynes Road to Sturbridge Center ending at Route 131.

Upgrade to Interstate Highway
Between 1949 and 1952, the Massachusetts Department of Public Works (MassDPW) initiated construction of the Wilbur Cross Highway extension to US Route 20 (US 20) in Sturbridge, with two lanes in each direction separated by a wide median and frequent U-turns.

Between 1955 and 1957, an extension was created to connect Route 15 to the new Massachusetts Turnpike, which opened on May 15, 1957. In 1958, I-84 was cosigned with Route 15 north and east of East Hartford, Connecticut, into Massachusetts.

In late 1968, the Federal Highway Administration (FHWA) approved a new Interstate connection from Hartford, Connecticut, to Providence, Rhode Island, which was to become part of a rerouted I-84. As a result, the existing section of I-84 from Manchester, Connecticut, to I-90 (overlapping Route 15) was redesignated I-86.

Shortly thereafter, MassDPW embarked on a reconstruction of its portion of the highway with new and reconstructed carriageways providing three  lanes and standard shoulders. Both carriageways were separated by a wide, forested variable median. New bridges, interchanges, and weigh stations were erected along the route. The $20-million (equivalent to $ in ) reconstruction project was completed in 1973. (Similar improvements in Connecticut were not completed until the 1980s.)

On October 1, 1980, the Connecticut Department of Transportation (CTDOT) decided to truncate Route 15 back to I-84 exit 57 (where it ends today), eliminating the overlap with I-86. Simultaneously, Massachusetts eliminated the overlap by decommissioning its Route 15 entirely.

Redesignation
When the planned portion of I-84 toward Providence ran into opposition in Rhode Island and was canceled in 1983, I-86 was officially reverted to I-84. The I-86 numbering was officially deleted on December 12, 1984. Plans to connect I-84 along the present day I-384/US 6 corridor from Hartford to Providence were scuttled for environmental reasons.  As a result, I-84 was rerouted back onto the completed I-86 freeway.

Exit list
The Massachusetts Department of Transportation (MassDOT) planned to convert I-84, along with the rest of the state's Interstates, to use milepost-based exits during 2016; however, this project was indefinitely postponed until November 18, 2019, when MassDOT confirmed that beginning in late summer 2020 the exit renumbering project will begin. On February 10, 2021, MassDOT announced in a blog post that the exit renumbering on I-84 will begin on February 28 and last for a week.

See also

References

External links

 Massachusetts
084
Transportation in Hampden County, Massachusetts
Transportation in Worcester County, Massachusetts